Lafer is a surname. Notable people with the name include:

Celso Lafer (born 1941), Brazilian jurist
Gordon Lafer (born 1960), American political economist
Johann Lafer (born 1957), Austrian chef

See also
Laffer (disambiguation), includes a list of people with surname Laffer